The Kyanakwe are, according to Lévi-Strauss, a "population" against whom in Zuñi mythology the ancestors of the Zuñi engaged in war.  Peace was not an option; the gods would grant final victory to one group alone.  The Kyanakwe are described variously as hunters and as gardeners.

The Kianakwe Dance commemorates the time when the early Zuni were looking for the Middle, and encountered the Kianakwe. The Kianakwe lived in large houses, wore long white robes, farmed large fields of corn and other crops, and were led by Chakwaina Okya, a large woman warrior.  The Zuni fought them for four days before the Kianakwe were routed.  The dance occurs every four years, when led by Kiamosona, they bring quantities of food.

Reference

Further reading
 Lévi-Strauss, "Structural Anthropology", 1963

Pueblo culture